Rochester Lady Lancers is an American women's soccer team based in Rochester, New York, founded in 2017. The team plays in the East conference of the United Women's Soccer league, in the second tier of women’s soccer in the United States and Canada.

History 

The team launched alongside the rebranded men's Rochester Lancers NPSL side in April 2017.

Team owner Salvatore 'SoccerSam' Fantauzzo hired coaches Sal Galvano and Loren Inglese to form the team within 30 days. Playing home games at the Aquinas Institute the team was winless in 2017. For 2018 the team played at Marina Auto Stadium in downtown Rochester, NY. Sal Galvano took over the head coaching duties with his player/assistant coach, Brooke Barbuto. The team finished the season in 3rd place with a record of 5-3-2;  Barbuto was named the MVP of the 2018 UWS Season.  In 2019 the team returned to Aquinas and fell to 3-5-2.  The 2020 UWS season was cancelled due to the pandemic; returning to play in 2021 the team posted a record of 0-12.

Stadium 

The Lady Lancers play home matches at Marina Auto Stadium

Year-by-year

Players

2018 Roster

2017 Roster

References

External links 
 

2017 establishments in New York (state)
Women's soccer clubs in the United States
Women's soccer clubs in New York (state)
Association football clubs established in 2017
United Women's Soccer teams
Lady Lancers